The 2015 AFC Cup knockout stage was played from 26 May to 31 October 2015. A total of 16 teams competed in the knockout stage to decide the champions of the 2015 AFC Cup.

Qualified teams
The winners and runners-up of each of the eight groups in the group stage qualified for the knockout stage. Both West Zone and East Zone had eight teams qualified.

Format
In the knockout stage, the 16 teams played a single-elimination tournament. In the quarter-finals and semi-finals, each tie was played on a home-and-away two-legged basis, while in the round of 16 and final, each tie was played as a single match. The away goals rule (for two-legged ties), extra time (away goals would not apply in extra time) and penalty shoot-out were used to decide the winner if necessary.

Schedule
The schedule of each round was as follows.

Bracket
In the round of 16, the winners of one group played the runners-up of another group in the same zone, with the group winners hosting the match. The matchups were determined as follows:

West Zone
Winner Group A vs. Runner-up Group C
Winner Group C vs. Runner-up Group A
Winner Group B vs. Runner-up Group D
Winner Group D vs. Runner-up Group B

East Zone
Winner Group E vs. Runner-up Group G
Winner Group G vs. Runner-up Group E
Winner Group F vs. Runner-up Group H
Winner Group H vs. Runner-up Group F

The draw for the quarter-finals was held on 18 June 2015, 15:00 UTC+8, at the Grand Millennium Hotel in Kuala Lumpur, Malaysia. Teams from different zones could be drawn into the same tie, and there was no seeding or country protection, so teams from the same association could be drawn into the same tie.

In the semi-finals, the matchups were determined by the quarter-final draw: Winner QF1 vs. Winner QF2 and Winner QF3 vs. Winner QF4, with winners QF2 and QF4 hosting the second leg.

In the final, the host team was determined by a draw, held after the quarter-final draw.

Round of 16

|-
!colspan=3|West Zone

|-
!colspan=3|East Zone

|}

The Persipura Jayapura v Pahang match was not played as scheduled as Pahang players were denied entry into Indonesia due to visa issues. The AFC announced on 10 June 2015 that as a result, Persipura Jayapura forfeited the match and was considered to have lost the match by 3–0, based on the AFC Cup 2015 Competition Regulations and the AFC Disciplinary Code.

Notes

Quarter-finals

|}

First leg

Second leg

Johor Darul Ta'zim won 4–2 on aggregate.

Al-Qadsia won 3–2 on aggregate.

Al-Kuwait won 7–1 on aggregate.

Istiklol won 5–3 on aggregate.

Notes

Semi-finals

|}

First leg

Second leg
On 16 October 2015, the Kuwait Football Association was suspended by FIFA. As a result, both Al-Qadsia and Al-Kuwait were no longer eligible to compete in the AFC Cup. The second legs of both semi-finals were cancelled, and Johor Darul Ta'zim and Istiklol advanced to the final by walkover.

Final

|}

References

External links
AFC Cup, the-AFC.com

3